Giovanni Gaddoni (born September 20, 1914 in Russi, Province of Ravenna) was an Italian professional football player.

1914 births
Year of death missing
People from Russi
Italian footballers
Serie A players
Serie B players
A.C. Reggiana 1919 players
Piacenza Calcio 1919 players
Torino F.C. players
Atalanta B.C. players
Inter Milan players
Genoa C.F.C. players
A.C. Monza players
U.S. Russi players
Association football forwards
Footballers from Emilia-Romagna
Sportspeople from the Province of Ravenna